In calculus, and especially multivariable calculus, the mean of a function is loosely defined as the average value of the function over its domain. In one variable, the mean of a function f(x) over the interval (a,b) is defined by:

 

Recall that a defining property of the average value  of finitely many numbers 
is that . In other words,  is the constant value which when
added to itself  times equals the result of adding the  terms . By analogy, a
defining property of the average value  of a function over the interval  is that

 

In other words,  is the constant value which when integrated over  equals the result of
But the integral of a constant  is just

 

See also the first mean value theorem for integration, which guarantees
that if  is continuous then there exists a point  such that

 

So we write
 and rearrange the preceding equation to get the above definition.

In several variables, the mean over a relatively compact domain U in a Euclidean space is defined by

This generalizes the arithmetic mean. On the other hand, it is also possible to generalize the geometric mean to functions by defining the geometric mean of f to be

More generally, in measure theory and probability theory, either sort of mean plays an important role. In this context, Jensen's inequality places sharp estimates on the relationship between these two different notions of the mean of a function.

There is also a harmonic average of functions and a quadratic average (or root mean square) of functions.

See also
Mean

Means
Calculus

References